Thérèse Raquin is a 1928 drama film directed by Jacques Feyder. It is the third silent film adaptation of the 1867 novel of the same name by Émile Zola. The film  stars Gina Manès as Thérèse Raquin, Wolfgang Zilzer as Monsieur Raquin, and Jeanne Marie-Laurent as Madame Raquin. The décors of the Paris suburbs for the film were built by André Andrejew. The film was produced by Deutsche Film Union in Germany, with German and French actors, in a French-German co-production, to be later released at the same time in France as Thérèse Raquin and Germany as Du sollst nicht ehebrechen!

As no words were spoken, both versions differed only in the language of intertitles. The British title at the time of the film's original release was Thou Shalt Not. This is the last of the silent film imports distributed by Warner Bros.' newly acquired First National subsidiary, containing no dialogue with music score and sound effects.

Thérèse Raquin is now considered a lost film, and only some production stills have survived.

Cast
Gina Manès as Thérèse Raquin
Hans Adalbert Schlettow as Laurent LeClaire
Jeanne Marie-Laurent as Madame Raquin
Wolfgang Zilzer as Camille Raquin
La Jana as Susanne Michaud
Paul Henckels as Grivet
Charles Barrois as Michaud
Peter C. Leska as Rolin

See also
List of lost films

References

External links

1928 drama films
1928 films
American black-and-white films
Films directed by Jacques Feyder
French drama films
German drama films
Films of the Weimar Republic
Lost French films
French silent feature films
German silent feature films
Films based on works by Émile Zola
German black-and-white films
1928 lost films
Lost drama films
Silent drama films
1920s French films
1920s German films